James Hansen (born 1941) is an American scientist and former head of the NASA Goddard Institute for Space Studies.

James or Jim Hansen may also refer to:
 James Hansen (politician) (1884–1951), member of the Legislative Assembly of Alberta
 James R. Hansen, American historian and author of First Man: The Life of Neil A. Armstrong
 Jim Hansen (Idaho politician) (born 1959), American politician from Idaho
 Jim Hansen (Missouri politician) (born 1947), American politician from Missouri
 Jim Hansen (Utah politician) (1932–2018), American politician from Utah

See also 
 James Hanson (disambiguation)